Mark Steven Ellis (born April 19, 1957) is an international criminal law expert and the executive director of the International Bar Association. He is the current chair of the UN-created Advisory Panel on Matters Relating to Defence Counsel of the Mechanism for International Criminal Tribunals.

From 1989 to 2000, Ellis was executive director of the American Bar Association Central European and Eurasian Law Initiative.
 
From 1999 to 2000, Ellis acted as Legal Advisor to the Independent International Commission on Kosovo, chaired by Justice Richard J. Goldstone, and was appointed by the Organization for Security and Co-operation in Europe to advise on the creation of Serbia's War Crimes Tribunal. He was involved with the trial of Saddam Hussein and also acted as legal advisor to the defense team of Nuon Chea at the Cambodian War Crimes Tribunal. In 2013, Ellis was admitted to the List of Assistants to Counsel of the International Criminal Court.
 
He is a former adjunct professor at Catholic University of America, Columbus School of Law, Washington, DC, and a current adjunct professor at Florida State University College of Law, Tallahassee, Florida.

Background and education 
Ellis was born in Washington D.C. He holds a B.S. in Economics (1979) and a J.D. (1984) from Florida State University. He completed two research grants to the European Union, one at the Institut d’Etudes Europeenes in Brussels, focussing on the law and institutions of the European Union, and the other at the Inter‑University Centre of postgraduate studies in Dubrovnik, in the Comparative Policy Studies Program for Yugoslav‑American Studies. In 2010, Ellis received his PhD in international law from King's College, London.

He has a twin brother named Scott Ellis, who is an American stage director, actor, and television director.

Career

Career as attorney 
Between 1984 and 1986, Ellis worked as an attorney for Johnson and Associates in Tallahassee where he represented clients on matters dealing with administrative and governmental law, international law, tax law, and trial litigation. From 1988 to 1990, Ellis worked in Washington, D.C. as an attorney at Klayman & Gurley, where he specialised in international trade matters, foreign direct investment and U.S. anti-dumping regulations. He represented the United States Information Agency (AmPart Program) on three separate programs in Central and Eastern Europe on formulating new investment policies.

Senior Consultant to the Foreign Investment Advisory Service of The World Bank 
From 1985 to 2000, Ellis acted as a senior consultant to the Foreign Investment Advisory Service of The World Bank. In that role, he focused on the legal environment for foreign investments in FSFR countries and the Balkans and advised Central and Eastern European governments on their draft investment laws.

Executive Director, American Bar Association Central European and Eurasian Law Initiative 

In 1989, Ellis became the first executive director of the American Bar Association Central European and Eurasian Law Initiative, since 2007 part of the American Bar Association Rule of Law Initiative. The initiative was created after the fall of the Berlin Wall, with the purpose of providing international legal technical assistance to countries in Europe and Eurasia. When the International Criminal Tribunal for the Former Yugoslavia conducted its first trial, Ellis initiated and oversaw an assistance program for the defence team.
Ellis was later appointed by the tribunal as a member of the Disciplinary Advisory Panel to the Defence Counsel for the International Criminal Tribunal for the Former Yugoslavia and International Criminal Tribunal for Rwanda. He later became President of the Coalition for International Justice.

Legal advisor to the Independent International Commission on Kosovo 

The Independent International Commission on Kosovo, chaired by Richard Goldstone, was a commission established in August 1999 in the aftermath of the Kosovo War. Ellis joined the commission as a legal advisor and assisted the twelve-member commission in examining key developments prior to, during, and after the Kosovo war, including systematic violations of human rights in the region.

The assessment of the Commission regarding the NATO bombing of Yugoslavia was that it was "illegal but justified." It reasoned that NATO had not been authorized by the UN Security Council, but the intervention was beneficial for the Kosovo population which was at a direct risk from the government crackdowns. However, the commission criticized NATO's Kosovo Force and the United Nations Interim Administration Mission in Kosovo for failing to protect minorities in Kosovo and allowing "reverse ethnic cleansing". The commission stated that the Kosovo Force was reluctant and did not have the capability to prevent violence against ethnic minorities and that the Kosovo Liberation Army and other Albanians ethnically cleansed Kosovo after the international presence was established in Kosovo.

Executive Director of the International Bar Association 

In 2000, Ellis became the executive director of the International Bar Association, the largest international organization of bar associations and individual lawyers, comprising 203 bar associations and 80,000 individual members from 194 countries. Since then, the organization has expanded in geographic scope, opening new regional offices in Latin America, Asia, North America, and The Hague.

Under the umbrella of the International Bar Association's Human Rights Institute, Ellis originated their International Criminal Court Programme in The Hague, to monitor fair trial and defence related issues at the court.

Ellis was also responsible, in partnership with Twanda Mutasah, for the creation of the Southern African Litigation Centre, a joint project of the International Bar Association's Human Rights Institute and the Open Society Initiative for Southern Africa, and focuses on three principal areas: support for human rights cases, advice on constitutional advocacy in the Southern African region, and training in human rights and rule of law issues. It is based in Johannesburg, and operates in Angola, Botswana, the Democratic Republic of Congo, Lesotho, Malawi, Mozambique, Namibia, Swaziland, Zambia and Zimbabwe.

During the setup of the Iraqi High Tribunal that tried Saddam Hussein, Ellis created an initiative to train and advise the Tribunal's judges and prosecutors, with support from the British Foreign Office.

Ellis conceived and set in motion the International Legal Assistance Consortium (ILAC), headquartered in Stockholm. ILAC provides initial assessments of what is needed to rebuild workable justice systems in post-conflict countries.

Moreover, Ellis initiated the creation of eyeWitness to Atrocities, a mobile phone application directed at using pictorial evidence of international crimes in a court of law. The eyeWitness project uses social media to document crimes in a secure and verifiable way. It addresses evidentiary challenges to the use of photographic evidence by capturing metadata, including the hash values of photos, videos, and audio recordings. The pixel value can be used to verify that footage has not been edited or altered. The information received is reviewed by an expert team, who then seeks to ensure that the data is used to prosecute perpetrators of international crimes.

Chair of the Management Board of the Central and Eastern European Law Initiative (CEELI) Institute 

In 2022, Ellis was appointed as the new Chair of the CEELI Institute Management Board. He oversees the institute's activities in advancing the rule of law, including supporting and fostering its Central and East European Judicial Exchange Network, composed of judges from eighteen countries in the region.

Academic activities 

Ellis received two Fulbright scholarships to the Institute of Economics, Zagreb, Croatia. 
From 1993 to 1997, he was Adjunct Professor at the Catholic University of America, Columbus School of Law.

In 2006, Ellis delivered the key note at the annual dinner of the National Capital Area Chapter of the Fulbright Association on "Ending the Crime of Genocide: Is the Doctrine of Humanitarian Intervention the Answer?"

In the same year, he held the Commencement Address to the Florida State University College of Law in Tallahassee, where, in 2010, he was named Adjunct Professor and co-teaches a course on International Human Rights Law and the course on International Criminal Law. He is a member of the Editorial Board of the Hague Journal on the Rule of Law and was an editor of the Journal of National Security Law and Policy.

On 22 February 2012, Ellis delivered the 10th Annual Ruth Steinkraus-Cohen International Law lecture at SOAS. 

In 2014, he held the Klatsky Lecture in Human Rights at Case Western Reserve University School of Law. In 2015, Ellis delivered the Lauterpacht Lecture at the University of Cambridge, and in the same year, delivered the Distinguished Jurist Lecture at McGeorge School of Law (2015). 

On 25 January 2016, Ellis spoke on "Shaping the Law: Civil Society Influence at International Criminal Courts" at an event held by the International Law Programme at Chatham House in association with Doughty Street Chambers.

In March 2021, he appeared as a speaker at the High-Level Conference on Rule of Law in Europe, hosted by Portugal during its EU-Council presidency. In May of the same year, Ellis delivered the keynote speech at the Legal Services of North Florida 2021 Law Day. In the same year, he held the keynote at the Case Western Reserve University event "The Academy and International Law: A Catalyst for Change and Innovation".

Publications 
Ellis has written or edited several books focused on  international criminal law and human rights law, including:

 Justice and Diplomacy: Resolving Contradictions in Diplomatic Practice and International Humanitarian Law, Cambridge University Press (co-author and co-editor with Yves Doutriaux And Tim Ryback, 2018).
 The International Criminal Court in an Effective Global Justice System, Edward Elgar Publishing (co-author with Professors Linda Carter and Charles Jalloh, 2016).
 Sovereignty and Justice: Creating Domestic War Crimes Courts within the Principle of Complementarity, Cambridge Scholars (author, 2014).
 Islamic Law and International Human Rights Law, Oxford Press (co-editor and co-author with Dr. Anver Emon and Mr. Ben Glahn, 2012).
 The International Criminal Court – Global Politics and the Quest for Justice, Idebate Press (co-Editor with Justice Richard Goldstone, 2008).
 Doing Business with Yugoslavia Economic and Legal Aspects, Ljubljana Press (co-editor and co-author, 1986). 
Contested Histories in Public Spaces: Principles, Processes, Best Practices" (2021)

He has also written contributions to books, articles in academic journals, book reviews, and policy papers primarily in the fields of international criminal law and international human rights law, and has published editorials in The New York Times, Washington Post, The London Times and the Huffington Post. Recently, Ellis published an article on "The Growing Crisis With the International Criminal Court" in JURIST, where he is a guest columnist.

Since 2018, Ellis contributes to Los Angeles Review of Books, were he has published reviews on William Schabas's "The Trial of the Kaiser", Michael Sfard's "The Wall and the Gate", Philippe Sands' "The Ratline," and Michael Fleming's "In the Shadow of the Holocaust." In 2022, he was interviewed by Don Franzen, the Los Angeles Review of Books' legal affairs editor, on Russia’s invasion of Ukraine.

Awards 

In 1998, Ellis received the American Bar Association's World Order Under Law Award. In 2010, he was recognized by Lawyer Magazine as one of the top 100 lawyers in the UK.
In October 2014, Ellis received the United States Department of State Recognition of lifelong commitment to the Rule of Law and contributions to international legal reform.

He is a recipient of The Florida State University's Distinguished Alumni Award (2013) and the Faculty Senate Torch Award (2014). He was also named distinguished FSU alumnus by the FSU College of Social Sciences.

In 2019, Ellis was awarded ILAC Lifetime Membership for his commitment to advancing the rule of law in conflict-affected and fragile countries.

In August 2022, Ellis was awarded with the "Order Defender of the Ukrainian Bar”.

Other activities related to international criminal law and the rule of law 

In 2006, Ellis became a member of the Advisory Panel to the Defence Counsel for the International Criminal Tribunal for the Former Yugoslavia and the International Criminal Tribunal for Rwanda. In 2013, he was admitted to the List of Assistants to Counsel of the International Criminal Court. He is currently involved in assisting the South Sudanese government on post-conflict accountability measures.

In 2014, Ellis chaired the Second International Meeting of Defence Offices at the Peace Palace in The Hague.

Moreover, Ellis is Co-Chair of the Advisory Board to New Perimeter, a nonprofit affiliate of the multinational law firm DLA Piper, and, in 2022, became Chair of the CEELI Institute’s Management Board.

He is a member of the Crimes Against Humanity Initiative Advisory Council, a project of the Whitney R. Harris World Law Institute at Washington University School of Law in St. Louis to establish the world's first treaty on the prevention and punishment of crimes against humanity.

Ellis co-conceived the Stockholm Human Rights Award and is a member of the Magnitzky Award Committee.

Activities with regard to the Russian invasion of Ukraine 
Since Russia's invasion of Ukraine in February 2022, Ellis has led the International Bar Association in its condemnation of Russia's illegal actions and initiated a series of programs to assist Ukraine. In October, the IBA and the Prosecutor General’s Office (PGO) of Ukraine signed a Memorandum of Understanding (MOU) on cooperation to ensure accountability for war crimes and other international crime. In November 2022, the IBA and Ukraine’s Ministry of Justice and Coordination Centre for Legal Aid Provision announced a Memorandum of Understanding to deepen engagement with Ukraine’s legal profession. As part of this, a Ukrainian language version of the IBA-founded eyeWitness to Atrocities app was launched to capture potential evidence of war crimes. Ellis has been an outspoken proponent to bringing Russian war criminals to justice and holding the Russian leadership accountable for launching the war. 

In August 2022, Ellis was admitted to the Ukrainian Bar Association after receiving the "Order Defender of the Ukrainian Bar”. On 29 November 2022, he opened the Russian War Crimes Exhibition in London hosted by First Lady of Ukraine Olena Zelenska.

Further reading and resources

References 

Living people
1957 births
20th-century English lawyers
21st-century English lawyers
Lawyers from London
International criminal law scholars
Florida State University faculty